Darzi Kola-ye Karim Kola (also Romanized as Darzī Kolā-ye Karīm Kolā; also known as Darzī Kolā) is a village in Karipey Rural District, Lalehabad District, Babol County, Mazandaran Province, Iran. At the 2006 census, its population was 494, in 117 families.

References 

Populated places in Babol County